This is a list of the first female members of parliament in each country and territory. Princess Isabel of Brazil could have become the first female parliamentarian in 1871, as the Brazilian constitution reserved a seat in the Senate for the heir presumptive to the throne once they reached 25 years of age. However, she did not take the seat she was entitled to. Instead, the first female parliamentarians came from the Grand Duchy of Finland, where 19 women were elected to the Eduskunta in 1907. The first female parliamentarian in a fully-independent country was Anna Rogstad of Norway, who took her seat in the Storting as a substitute in 1911, while the first woman directly elected to parliament in an independent country was Jeannette Rankin of the United States, who was elected to the House of Representatives in 1916, taking office the following year.

In some cases – such as Grace Schneiders-Howard of Suriname – women were elected before they had the right to vote, having been granted the right to stand as candidates but not active suffrage. In many cases, the first female parliamentarians were appointed rather than elected members. Only one sovereign country – the Vatican City – has never had a female parliamentarian as membership of the Vatican legislature, the Pontifical Commission, is limited to cardinals, all of whom are men.

List of the first female members of parliament by country
Members are listed by when they took office. The list excludes members of provisional, non-elected legislatures constituted during or following conflicts.

References

first
first